Lawrence James Miller (born April 4, 1946) is a retired American basketball player.

As the All-American star of his Catasauqua High School team, Miller scored 46 of his team's 66 points and grabbed 20 rebounds in a 66-62 win over Steelton High in the 1964 Pennsylvania state playoffs at the Hershey Arena.

A  guard/forward born in Allentown, Pennsylvania, Miller played at the University of North Carolina during the 1960s. He earned ACC Men's Basketball Player of the Year honors in 1966 and 1967. In 2002, Miller was named to the ACC 50th Anniversary men's basketball team as one of the fifty greatest players in Atlantic Coast Conference history.

Miller was drafted in 1968 by the NBA's Philadelphia 76ers (5th round, 62nd overall pick), but never played in that league. From 1968 to 1975, he played professionally in the American Basketball Association as a member of the Los Angeles Stars, Carolina Cougars, San Diego Conquistadors, Virginia Squires, and Utah Stars. He averaged 13.6 points per game in his career and set the ABA record of 67 points in a game on March 18, 1972.

Since his retirement, he works in real estate construction.

References

External links

1946 births
Living people
All-American college men's basketball players
American men's basketball players
Basketball players from Pennsylvania
Carolina Cougars players
Los Angeles Stars draft picks
Los Angeles Stars players
North Carolina Tar Heels men's basketball players
Parade High School All-Americans (boys' basketball)
Philadelphia 76ers draft picks
San Diego Conquistadors players
Shooting guards
Small forwards
Sportspeople from Allentown, Pennsylvania
Utah Stars players
Virginia Squires players
Catasauqua High School alumni